Shrikant Shrihari Mundhe (born 27 October 1988) is an Indian first-class cricketer who plays for Maharashtra in domestic cricket. He is a right-hand batsman and right-arm medium-pace bowler. He has represented Pune Warriors in the 2011 edition of Indian Premier League.

In December 2018, he was bought by the Kolkata Knight Riders in the player auction for the 2019 Indian Premier League. He was released by the Kolkata Knight Riders ahead of the 2020 IPL auction.

References

External links 

Living people
1988 births
Indian cricketers
Maharashtra cricketers
Pune Warriors India cricketers
West Zone cricketers
India Red cricketers